Polson Airport  is a public use airport in Lake County, Montana, United States. It is located one nautical mile (2 km) west of the central business district of Polson, a city on the southern shore of Flathead Lake. The airport is owned by the City of Polson and Lake County. It is included in the National Plan of Integrated Airport Systems for 2011–2015, which categorized it as a general aviation facility.

Facilities and aircraft 
Polson Airport covers an area of 97 acres (39 ha) at an elevation of 2,941 feet (896 m) above mean sea level. It has one asphalt paved runway designated 18/36 which measures 4,195 by 75 feet (1,279 x 23 m). It also has a seaplane landing area designated 3W/21W with a water surface measuring 4,000 by 500 feet (1,219 x 152 m).

For the 12-month period ending July 22, 2008, the airport had 9,750 aircraft operations, an average of 26 per day: 97% general aviation, 2% air taxi, and 1% military.
At that time there were 30 aircraft based at this airport: 90% single-engine, 3% jet, 3% helicopter, and 3% glider.

See also 
 List of airports in Montana

References

External links 
 Aerial image as of July 1990 from USGS The National Map
 
 

Airports in Montana
Transportation in Lake County, Montana
Buildings and structures in Lake County, Montana